Mihelca is a small settlement in the Primskovo area of the Municipality of Šmartno pri Litiji in central Slovenia. The area is part of the historical region of Lower Carniola and is now included in the Central Slovenia Statistical Region. 

A small chapel-shrine on Fat Hill in the settlement is dedicated to the Virgin Mary and dates to the late 18th century.

References

External links
Mihelca at Geopedia

Populated places in the Municipality of Šmartno pri Litiji